St Michaels is a village in the civil parish of Tenterden, in the Ashford district, in the county of Kent, England. Before 1863 it was known as Boar's Isle or Boresisle.

References

External links
 Tenterden Town website Official website for Tenterden including St Michaels, Tenterden Town Council, and Tenterden and District Chamber of Commerce
 St Michaels website The St Michaels Village Committee website

Villages in Kent
Tenterden